Lesonice is a municipality and village in Třebíč District in the Vysočina Region of the Czech Republic. It has about 500 inhabitants.

Administrative parts
The village of Horní Lažany is an administrative part of Lesonice.

References

Villages in Třebíč District